The Broxbourne Council election, 1990 was held to elect council members of the Broxbourne Borough Council, the local government authority of the borough of Broxbourne, Hertfordshire, England.

Composition of expiring seats before election

Election results

Results summary 

An election was held in 14 wards on 3 May 1990.

15 council seats were contested (2 seats in Hoddesdon North Ward)

The Labour Party gained a seat from the Conservative Party in Bury Green Ward

Conservative 35 seats
Labour 6 seats
Liberal Democrats 1 Seat

Ward results

References

1990
1990 English local elections
1990s in Hertfordshire